The Murray River Flag  is flown from paddle steamers and other vessels in the Australian States of New South Wales, Victoria and South Australia that ply the waters of the Murray-Darling river system. Little is known about the flag's early history but it may have originated as far back as 1850 when the formation of the Murray River League was announced. R. W. Beddome, founder of the League, enthused "Up with the Murray flag." No fragments of the original Murray River Flag are known to exist and three versions have passed down to the present day.

History 

The earliest recorded reference to the Murray River Flag was at Goolwa to honour the first paddlesteamer to go into service on the Murray. The Mary Ann, built by three brothers William, Thomas and Elliot Randell, began her voyage from Mannum downstream to Goolwa on 4 March 1853. The Murray River Flag was hoisted upon their arrival. The flag was described by a reporter of the Australian Register:

"The flag bears a red cross with four horizontal blue bars. The cross being charged with five stars as emblems of the Colonies while the upper corner, is taken up with British connections which is depicted by the Union Jack. It has been named, we understand, the Murray River Flag." 

It is believed that the blue bars represent the Murray River and the three major rivers that run into it: the Murrumbidgee, Lachlan and the Darling. The design bears a strong resemblance to other Australian flags of the 19th Century, such as the Australian Federation Flag and the National Colonial Flag for Australia.

Modern Usage 

Today the Murray River is represented by three flags, each similar but based on different interpretations of the original description. The Upper Murray Flag has darker blue bands on its flag, representing the darker waters of the river's upper reaches. This design was also the house flag of the Murray River Steam Navigation Co. which suggests that it is a lineal descendant of the original flag design. The Lower Murray Flag, used predominantly in South Australia, is distinguished by the use of pale blue bands representing the lighter coloured water of the lower reaches of the Murray. A third variant, the Combined Murray Flag, is used on the upper reaches of the Murray in New South Wales.

See also
 List of Australian flags
 Union Flag

Notes

References

Flags of Australia
Murray River
1850 establishments in Australia